Diego Leonardo de Andrade Carvalho (born 8 August 1977) is a Brazilian politician from the Social Democratic Party. He has been Majority Leader of the Chamber of Deputies since 5 April 2021.

References 

Living people
1977 births
Members of the Chamber of Deputies (Brazil) from Minas Gerais
Social Democratic Party (Brazil, 2011) politicians
21st-century Brazilian politicians

People from Belo Horizonte